Leonardo Coelho Santos (born 10 April 1995 in Rio de Janeiro) is a Brazilian swimmer.

International career

At the 2018 FINA World Swimming Championships (25 m) in Hangzhou, China, Leonardo Santos, along with Luiz Altamir Melo, Fernando Scheffer and Breno Correia, surprised the world by winning the gold medal in the Men's 4 × 200 metre freestyle relay, breaking the world record, with a time of 6:46.81. The relay was composed only by young people between 19 and 23 years, and was not favorite to gold. He also finished 6th in the Men's 200 metre individual medley, and 15th in the Men's 400 metre individual medley.

At the 2019 World Aquatics Championships in Gwangju, South Korea, he finished 14th in the Men's 200 metre individual medley.

At the 2019 Pan American Games held in Lima, Peru, he won a silver medal in the Men's 400 metre individual medley, and a bronze medal in the Men's 200 metre individual medley.

At the 2021 FINA World Swimming Championships (25 m) in Abu Dhabi, United Arab Emirates, in the Men's 4 × 200 metre freestyle relay, the Brazilian relay, composed by Breno Correia, Murilo Sartori, Kaique Alves and Fernando Scheffer, again obtained a medal, now bronze, maintaining the good performance of 2018, when Brazil won the gold beating the world record. Coelho Santos won a medal for participating in the competition's heats.  He also finished 11th in the Men's 200 metre individual medley, 12th in the Men's 100 metre individual medley, 16th in the Men's 400 metre individual medley and 34th in the Men's 100 metre butterfly

At the 2022 FINA World Swimming Championships (25 m), in Melbourne, Australia, he finished 9th in the Men's 200 metre individual medley, 9th in the Men's 4 × 200 metre freestyle relay, 13th in the Men's 100 metre individual medley and 23rd in the Men's 100 metre butterfly.

References

External links 
 

1995 births
Living people
Brazilian male medley swimmers
Brazilian male freestyle swimmers
World record holders in swimming
Medalists at the FINA World Swimming Championships (25 m)
Swimmers at the 2019 Pan American Games
Pan American Games medalists in swimming
Pan American Games silver medalists for Brazil
Pan American Games bronze medalists for Brazil
Medalists at the 2019 Pan American Games
Swimmers from Rio de Janeiro (city)
21st-century Brazilian people
20th-century Brazilian people
Competitors at the 2022 South American Games
South American Games gold medalists for Brazil
South American Games silver medalists for Brazil
South American Games medalists in swimming